Pool shark or pool sharks may refer to:
 Pool shark, to distract, or hustle, in pool

Film and television
 Pool Sharks, or sometimes The Pool Shark, a 1915 silent film
 "Pool Shark", an episode of Drake & Josh TV show, 2004

Music 
 The Pool Shark, an album by Dave Dudley, 1970
 "The Pool Shark" (song), a song written by Tom T. Hall, recorded by Dave Dudley
 "Pool Shark", a 1987 song by The Toasters from their album Skaboom
 "Pool Shark", a 1994 song by Sublime, from their album Robbin' the Hood
 "Pool Shark", a 2009 song by The Cherry Poppin' Daddies, from their album Skaboy JFK

Other uses
 Pool Shark (video game), also known as Actua Pool, 1999
 Pool Shark 2, a sequel

See also
 
 Pool (disambiguation)
 Shark (disambiguation)